Patricia "Patti" Anderson (born June 4, 1966) is an American politician serving in the Minnesota House of Representatives since 2023. A member of the Republican Party of Minnesota, Anderson represents District 33A in the northeastern Twin Cities metropolitan area, which includes the cities of Forest Lake, Hugo, and Mahtomedi and parts of Washington County, Minnesota.

Anderson served one term as the State Auditor of Minnesota, from 2003 to 2007, and ran unsuccessfully in 2006 and 2010. Anderson is the most recent Republican to hold the office of State Auditor. She was Mayor of Eagan, Minnesota and was a former national committeewoman for Minnesota to the Republican National Committee.

Early life, education and career
Anderson graduated from Forest Lake Area High School and received a bachelor of arts in international relations and political economy from the University of Minnesota. She earned a master of arts in public administration from Hamline University.

Anderson served as a city council member of Eagan, Minnesota from 1991-98, and served as mayor from 1998-2002. In 2002, Anderson was named best mayor in the state by City Pages.

From 2008 to 2009, Anderson served as President of the Minnesota Free Market Institute, a right wing think tank. She said that as president she hoped to expand the institute by adding personnel and partnering with nonprofits with similar goals. After Anderson left, the organization was merged into the Center of the American Experiment, last filing tax returns in 2011.

State Auditor
Anderson was elected State Auditor of Minnesota on November 5, 2002. She ran after two term DFL incumbent Judi Dutcher announced she would not seek re-election, running unsuccessfully for Governor of Minnesota. Anderson defeated DFL-nominee and State Treasurer Carol Johnson, as well as Independence Party nominee Dave Hutcheson.

Anderson was elected as Pat Awada, the name she held prior to the finalization of her divorce in 2004. During her term as Auditor, Governor Tim Pawlenty called for cuts across the state budget, and Anderson cut staff, earning a reputation as a "taxpayer watchdog".

Anderson ran for re-election in 2006, losing to DFL-nominee and State Representative Rebecca Otto in the general election.

Commissioner of Employee Relations
In January 2007, Governor Tim Pawlenty nominated Anderson to serve as Commissioner of Department of Employee Relations, her responsibilities included the merger of that agency into the Department of Finance.

2010 run for Governor and State Auditor
On July 15, 2009, Anderson announced that she was running for Governor of Minnesota in the 2010 election, describing herself as a "Libertarian-style Republican" who opposes corporate subsidies. On January 12, 2010, Anderson announced that she was withdrawing from the governor's race to run for State Auditor. Anderson again lost to DFL-incumbent Rebecca Otto.

Republican National Committeewoman
On April 16, 2011, Anderson was elected national committeewoman for Minnesota to the Republican National Committee to serve out the remaining term of Evie Axdahl, who retired. On May 19, 2012, Janet Biehoffer defeated Anderson in her quest for a full term as a national committeewoman to the RNC.

Shortly, after being elected to the Republican National Committee, Anderson became a lobbyist for Canterbury Park Racetrack. At the time, the Minnesota Republican Party Platform opposed  expansion of gambling in Minnesota. Many Republicans criticized Anderson for failing to disclose her intention to become a lobbyist for a gambling enterprise while running for the RNC.

Minnesota House of Representatives
Anderson was elected to the Minnesota House of Representatives in 2022. She first ran in 2018 after seven-term Republican incumbent Matt Dean announced he would not seek reelection to run for Governor of Minnesota. Anderson lost in the general election to DFL-nominee Ami Wazlawik. Anderson ran again in 2022 and won, after redistricting and eight-term Republican incumbent Bob Dettmer announced he would not seek reelection. Anderson serves on the Education Finance and Taxes Committees.

Electoral history

Personal life 
Anderson lives in Dellwood, Minnesota with her spouse, Doug, and has six children.

References

External links 

 Official House of Representatives website
 Official campaign website

1966 births
Hamline University alumni
Living people
People from Saint Paul, Minnesota
People from Eagan, Minnesota
University of Minnesota alumni
State Auditors of Minnesota
Minnesota Republicans
Mayors of places in Minnesota
Women mayors of places in Minnesota
20th-century American politicians
20th-century American women politicians
21st-century American politicians
21st-century American women politicians